Abil al-Qamh was a Palestinian village located near the Lebanese border north of Safad. It was depopulated in 1948. It was located at the site of the biblical city of Abel-beth-maachah.

Name
According to Khalidi, its Arabic name derives from Aramaic; the first part of its name, abil, means "meadow" and the latter part, qamh, means "wheat". According to Palmer, who wrote in the 19th century when the name of the village was Abl, it was probably derived from the biblical name Abel Beth Maachah.

History

Bronze Age and Iron Age

Abil al-Qamh was established on a site that had been inhabited since 2900 BCE and remained populated for over 2,000 years. It was captured by Thutmose III in 1468 BCE. During the Israelite period, under the reign of David, it was fortified, and later conquered by the Arameans. In 734 BCE it was incorporated into the Assyrian Empire.

Byzantine period
Ceramics from the Byzantine era have been found here.

Mamluk period
Under Mamluk rule in 1226 CE, Arab geographer Yaqut al-Hamawi mentions "Abil al Kamh" as a village belonging to Banias, between Damascus and the Mediterranean Sea.

Ottoman period
In 1517, Abil al-Qamh was incorporated into the Ottoman Empire, and by 1596 it was under the administration of the nahiya ("subdistrict") of Tibnin, part of Sanjak Safad, and went under the name of Abil al-Qamh, with a population of 24 families and 2 bachelors, an estimated 143 persona. All the villagers were Muslim. They paid a fixed tax rate of 25% on wheat, barley, olives, beehives, vineyards, goats and beehives; a total of 1,846 Akçe.

In 1838 it was noted as Catholic village in the Mejr Ayun district.

In 1875 Victor Guérin visited the place, which he called Tell Abel Kamah. On the highest point, to the north, he found the ruins of a wall and a Muslim cemetery.
In 1881, the PEF's Survey of Western Palestine (SWP) described the village as being near a stream, and containing a church and ancient ruins.

British Mandate
Abil al-Qamh was a part of the French Mandate of Lebanon until 1923 when it was incorporated into the British Mandate in Palestine. In the first half of the 20th century, it had a triangular outline that conformed to the hill on which it was built. Agriculture was the basis of its economy, and the village's abundant water supply earned it the local name of Abil al-Mayya meaning the "Meadow of Water".

In the 1931 census of Palestine Abil al-Qamh had a total population of 229; 122 Muslims and 107 Christians, in a total of 58 houses.

In the 1945 statistics the population was 330; 230 Muslims and 100 Christians, with a total of 4,615 dunams of land, according to an official land and population survey. The village had a mixed population of 230 Shia Muslims and 100 Arab Christians. A total of 3,535 dunums of land were allocated to cereals; 299 dunums were irrigated or used for orchards, while 13 dunams was built-up (urban) area.

1948 and aftermath
Abil al-Qamh was captured and depopulated on May 10, 1948, by the First Battalion of the Palmach commanded by Yigal Allon in Operation Yifatch. There was no fighting in the village, but after the fall of Safad to Israel and from a "whispering campaign" by local Jewish leaders to the heads of Arab villages (makhatir) warning them of massive Jewish reinforcements arriving in the Galilee, the residents of Abil al-Qamh fled.

In 1952, Israel established the town of Yuval on village lands,  from the village site. The site itself is "overgrown with grasses and weeds. A grove of trees stands in the northeast corner, and stones from destroyed houses are strewn throughout the site...," according to Palestinian historian Walid Khalidi in 1992.

In recent years, the Lebanese Authorities has claimed that Abil al-Qamh and six other depopulated Shia villages along the border belong to Lebanon.

The two mounds belonging to the archaeological site known as Tell Abil el-Qameḥ in Arabic and Tel Abel Beth Maacah in Hebrew have been surveyed in 2012 and have since been excavated in annual campaigns (four as of 2016).

Refugees
The inhabitants of Abil al-Qamh fled to the neighbouring Lebanese Christian villages, specially the village of Deirmimas where most of them later acquired Lebanese passports; still living in Deirmimas are for instance the families of Abdo, Keserwany, Harfouch, and Haddad.

See also
List of towns and villages depopulated during the 1947–1949 Palestine war
Metawali - Shia Twelvers in Lebanon
Shia villages in Palestine

References

Bibliography

External links
Welcome to Abil-al-Qamh 
Abil al-Qamh, Zochrot
Survey of Western Palestine, Map 2: IAA, Wikimedia commons
Abil al-Qamh, at Khalil Sakakini Cultural Center
Abil al-Qamh, Dr. Khalil Rizk.

Arab villages depopulated prior to the 1948 Arab–Israeli War
District of Safad